Faridpur is a village of Dildarnagar Kamsar located in Ghazipur District of Uttar Pradesh, India. Faridpur was part of Usia village but was later separated from Usia and was made a new village in 2016, when Seorai tehsil was made. Almost 200 Kamsaar Pathans Live in the villages as of 2011.

References

Villages in Ghazipur district